Fréville-du-Gâtinais (literally Fréville of the Gâtinais) is a commune in the Loiret department in north-central France.

See also
Communes of the Loiret department

References

Frevilledugatinais